The first season of El hotel de los famosos (in English: The Hotel Of The Famous 1) was a reality show on eltrece, in which celebrities undergo a four-month confinement in a hotel without access to the outside. The Argentine program was scheduled to premiere on February 28, 2022, but it was postponed to March 21 of the same year.

Hosts and managers 

 Hosts
 Pampita and Leandro Leunis present the galas where the challenges that the participants must face and the eliminations, among other things, will be known.
 Rodrigo Lussich and Adrián Pallares are in charge of the weekly debate together with a team of panelists made up of Dalia Gutmann, José María Muscari, Romina Scalora and Tomás Balmaceda.
 Candela Ruggeri is the digital host in charge of the program's social networks.
 Managers
 Gabriel Oliveri, hotel manager
 José María Muscari, emotional coach
 Juan Miceli, in charge of the gardens
 Christian Petersen, kitchen manager

Format 
Sixteen participants will remain isolated from the outside in a hotel, specially designed for a reality show, with all the comforts. There are four months of coexistence and competition, a weekly elimination and a single winner who will take 10 million Argentine pesos.

A group of celebrities travels to a dream vacation, in a hotel on the outskirts of the city, with all the luxury and comfort. There is only one detail: The hotel does not have employees.

At the beginning of each week, teams are drawn up to face each other in a challenge that will define who are guests (those who enjoy themselves) and who are hotel staff (those who work so that others enjoy).

Guests stay in upgraded rooms, and have access to the pool, spa, and bar. They will have buffet breakfast and other meals. They can enjoy games, sports, recreational activities, themed parties, live shows and gourmet dinners by guest chefs. Every week, two participants have the opportunity to become VIP guests and access the master suite, the most exclusive room in the entire complex.

The staff stay in the Service Area (the least comfortable space in the hotel). They are in charge of maintenance and guest service tasks: washing linen, preparing breakfast and other meals, taking care of green spaces and the swimming pool, repair and general maintenance of the facilities.

Every day, a different challenge changes the course of coexistence. Dexterity, ability, intelligence and endurance will be put to the test. The winners will access benefits for the stay. The losers will be nominated. In addition, all the inhabitants face the "All against All", the nomination event that will put a participant closer to the nomination. At the end of the week, an elimination duel defines who leaves the hotel.

The game area is made up of four sections: the Team Challenge set, the Individual Challenge set, the Labyrinth and the Elimination Duel in the H.

Participants

Participants 
On January 25, 2021, the official list of contestants was confirmed.

Weekly accommodations 
 Bold: VIP Guest
 Italic: Worst staff (weeks 1-9, 13) / Best staff (weeks 10-12,14)
 →← Participants who exchange locations by winning or losing the Guest and Staff challenges

Nominations table 
 Bold - Indicates that the vote corresponds to "Face to Face"
 Italic  - Indicates that the vote corresponds to "All against all"
 * - The vote corresponds to the captain of the Huesped team due to a tie

  This contestant was inmune 
 Positive vote

Summary statistics 

 Bold text: nominees who transformed into dualists and competed in the elimination pot.

Reception and episodes 
El hotel de los famosos was broadcast on Monday, Tuesday, Wednesday, Thursday and Fridays (the debate is broadcast on Saturday), on eltrece. The show's debut averaged 13.6 ratings points, and with an peak of more than 14 points, by a small difference it did not beat the competition but it did match the rating of Sen Anlat Karadeniz (a Turkish soap opera). By moments, it vastly outperformed the competition, becoming the most third most watched program of the day by points. On the last episode averaged 13.6, with an peak of 17.5, being that the biggest peak of all the show, and outperforming The Voice Argentina. The finale was broadcast before the premiere of All Together Now Argentina, and being the second most viewed program of the day, being only outperformed by  the premiere of All Together Now.

Episodes of El Hotel De Famosos 

 Notes
      Most viewed chapter.     It was the most viewed of the day.

Notes

References 

2020s reality television series